The 1955 North Dakota State Bison football team was an American football team that represented North Dakota State University during the 1955 college football season as a member of the North Central Conference. In their second year under head coach Del Anderson, the team compiled a 0–9 record.

Schedule

References

North Dakota State
North Dakota State Bison football seasons
College football winless seasons
North Dakota State Bison football